Mahamahopadhyaya Ramacharya Narsimhacharya Galagali (1892–1981) was a notable Indian Sanskrit scholar and poet of two Mahakavyam. He was a recipient of President’s Certificate of Honor. He also received honorary Mahamahopadhyaya honor from Bharatiya Sanskrit Sansthan Parishad Prayag.

He was born in 1893, In Galagali village on the bank of Krishna River in the Bijapur District of Karnataka.

References 

Indian Sanskrit scholars
People from Bijapur district, Karnataka
1892 births
1981 deaths